Bao Mu (保姆, Ama) is a term for "mother" in several different languages and contexts, see mama and papa. It has also become a term for the job of a combined nanny and housemaid, see Amah (occupation).

In China
In Chinese, amah ("grandmother") is often used as an equivalent of the English word "nanny"—the term does not refer to a wet nurse or a servant, but rather a "friend" who helps a family to raise a child. This is a common occupation in China. However some parts, still used amah as ("grandmother") and it is not considered rude. 
 
During the Tang dynasty, the word amah was used as an informal and poetic title for the Taoist goddess Queen Mother of the West.

Amah is the Mosuo term for mother. 

It is a specific Hokkien honorific.

References

Motherhood

YES